The Brookeville Woolen Mill and House is a historic home and woolen mill located in Brookeville, Maryland, in Montgomery County.  The complex consists of two buildings constructed of rubble masonry. The woolen mill is a small one-story structure. South of the mill are two stone worker's houses, one of which is a three-by-two-bay, -story stone house. The house was most likely constructed prior to 1783. The complex may have been built by the Riggs family, who later became well-known bankers and merchants in Washington, D.C.

It was listed on the National Register of Historic Places in 1978.

References

External links
"Brookeville Woolen Mill," Maryland State Archives (Biographical Series) 
, including photo in 2003, at Maryland Historical Trust website

Houses completed in 1783
Houses in Montgomery County, Maryland
Houses on the National Register of Historic Places in Maryland
Historic districts on the National Register of Historic Places in Maryland
National Register of Historic Places in Montgomery County, Maryland
Woollen mills